Joseph White Farnham (December 2, 1884 – June 2, 1931) was an American playwright, film writer, and film editor of the silent movie era in the 1920s. He was also a founding member of the Academy of Motion Picture Arts and Sciences.

Biography 

Born in New Haven, Connecticut in 1884, Farnham got his start in film through his business relationship with theatre impresarios Gustave and Daniel Frohman who owned The Frohman Amusement Corp. The Big Parade is probably the most famous of his works adapted to film. In the 1st Academy Awards of 1929, nominees could be considered for an Oscar for an award on the basis of multiple films within the year. Joseph won his Best Writing - Title Cards award for the films The Fair Co-Ed; Laugh, Clown, Laugh; and Telling the World. This was the only year that an Oscar for title cards would be awarded.

Joseph Farnham was the very first Academy Award winner to die. He died in 1931 of a heart attack while living in Los Angeles and was interred in the Forest Lawn Memorial Park Cemetery in Glendale, California.

Selected filmography
 Bachelor Apartments (1921)
The Country Flapper (1922)
 The Snitching Hour (1922)
 Greed (1924)
 Reckless Romance (1924)
 Soul Mates (1925)
 The Big Parade (1925)
 Stop Flirting (1925)
 The Blackbird (1926)
 Beverly of Graustark (1926)
 The Road to Mandalay (1926)
 The Show (1927)
 The Red Mill (1927)
 Slide, Kelly, Slide (1927)
 Rookies (1927)
 Becky (1927)
 London After Midnight (1927)
 The Trail of '98 (1928)
 Alias Jimmy Valentine (1928)
 Laugh, Clown, Laugh (1928)
 The Cameraman (1928)
 The Duke Steps Out (1929)
 Where East Is East (1929)
 The Unholy Night (1929)
 The Thirteenth Chair (1929)
 The Big House (1930)

References

External links

 

1884 births
1931 deaths
Academy of Motion Picture Arts and Sciences founders
American male screenwriters
Writers from New Haven, Connecticut
Burials at Forest Lawn Memorial Park (Glendale)
Screenwriters from Connecticut
20th-century American male writers
20th-century American screenwriters